The whitetips are a small group of hummingbirds in the genus Urosticte, which are restricted to humid forests growing on Andean slopes in north-western South America. Their common name, whitetips, refers to the conspicuous white tips on the central rectrices of the males. As the central rectrices are shorter than the outer, it appears as a large white spot on the central uppertail. Females, which have green-spotted white underparts, lack the white tips to the central rectrices, but instead have broad tips to the outer rectrices (white "tail-corners").

In this genus, the taxon intermedia has been considered a distinct species, or alternatively an intermediate between U. benjamini and U. ruficrissa, leading to these being considered conspecific. At present, intermedia is considered a variant and junior synonym of ruficrissa, resulting in two monotypic species being recognized:

Species
The genus contains two species.

References

 Split Urosticte ruficrissa from U. benjamini (and not recognize U. "intermedia") - South American Check-list Committee.